The Indianapolis City Market is a historic public market located in Indianapolis, Indiana. It was founded in 1821 and officially opened in its current facility in 1886. The market building is a one-story, rectangular brick building trimmed in limestone. It has a front gable center section flanked by square towers. While it was originally a farmers market, it is now a food hall. The Indianapolis City Market also hosted some events for Super Bowl XLVI in Indianapolis.

The market was listed on the National Register of Historic Places in 1974.

The $175 million project will also include converting the office building at 151 N. Delaware Street into a 350-unit multi-family housing tower and would result in the block having the highest population density in the state of Indiana.

References

External links

National Park Service: City Market

Historic sites in Indiana
Historic American Engineering Record in Indiana
Commercial buildings on the National Register of Historic Places in Indiana
Commercial buildings completed in 1886
1821 establishments in Indiana
Buildings and structures in Indianapolis
National Register of Historic Places in Indianapolis
Food halls